The 12163/12164 Mumbai Lokmanya Tilak Terminus -  Chennai Central Superfast Express is a Superfast Express train belonging to Indian Railways - Central Railways zone that runs between Lokmanya Tilak Terminus and Chennai Central in India. Its terminal was changed in both directions from Dadar to Lokmanya Tilak Terminus and to Chennai Central from Chennai Egmore.

It operates as train number 12163 from Lokmanya Tilak Terminus to Chennai Central and as train number 12164 in the reverse direction serving the states of Maharashtra, Karnataka, Andhra Pradesh and Tamil Nadu. The train now departs from Lokmanya Tilak Terminus from 1 July 2020 and arrives at Chennai Central.

Coaches

As with most train services in India, Coach Composition may be amended at the discretion of Indian Railways depending on demand.

Coach composition (Downward - 12163)

The train consists of:
 1 AC Two Tier
 4 AC Three Tier coaches 
 10 Sleeper Class
 3 General Unreserved 
 1 AC Hot Buffet Car (Pantry)
 1 High Capacity Parcel Van (HCPV)
 1 End On Generator
 1 SLR

Service

The 12163/64 Mumbai Lokmanya Tilak Terminus -  Chennai Central Superfast Express covers the distance of 1261 kilometres in 21 hours 45 mins as 12163 Mumbai Lokmanya Tilak Terminus - Chennai Central Superfast Express (58 km/hr) & 1261 kilometres in 21 hrs 20 mins as 12164 Chennai Central -  Mumbai Lokmanya Tilak Terminus Superfast Express (59 km/hr).

As the average speed of the train is above 55 km/hr, as per Indian Railways rules, its fare includes a superfast surcharge.

Routing

The 12163/64 Mumbai Lokmanya Tilak Terminus -  Chennai Central Superfast Express runs via Khandala railway station, Pune Junction, Solapur Junction, Adoni, Guntakal Junction, Renigunta Junction to Chennai Central.

Traction

The 12163/64 Mumbai Lokmanya Tilak Terminus -  Chennai Central Superfast Express is hauled by WAP 7 of KYN, RPM, or ED shed throughout its journey.

Timings

12163 Mumbai Lokmanya Tilak Terminus - Chennai Central Superfast Express leaves Lokmanya Tilak Terminus Everyday at 18:45 hrs IST and reaches Chennai Central at 16:30 hrs IST the next day.

12164 Chennai Central - Mumbai Lokmanya Tilak Terminus Superfast Express leaves Chennai Central everyday at 18:20 hrs IST and reaches Lokmanya Tilak Terminus at 15:40 hrs IST the next day.

Shares 6 Rakes with 20103/20104 Mumbai LTT - Gorakhpur SF Express (Via Kanpur) aka Sant Kabir Dham Express

External links

References 

Express trains in India
Rail transport in Karnataka
Rail transport in Andhra Pradesh
Rail transport in Tamil Nadu
Rail transport in Maharashtra
Transport in Mumbai
Transport in Chennai